The World Trade Organization (WTO) is an intergovernmental organization that regulates and facilitates international trade. With effective cooperation 
in the United Nations System,  governments use the organization to establish, revise, and enforce the rules that govern international trade. It officially commenced operations on 1 January 1995, pursuant to the 1994 Marrakesh Agreement, thus replacing the General Agreement on Tariffs and Trade (GATT) that had been established in 1948. The WTO is the world's largest international economic organization, with 164 member states representing over 98% of global trade and global GDP.

The WTO facilitates trade in goods, services and intellectual property among participating countries by providing a framework for negotiating trade agreements, which usually aim to reduce or eliminate tariffs, quotas, and other restrictions; these agreements are signed by representatives of member governments and ratified by their legislatures. The WTO also administers independent dispute resolution for enforcing participants' adherence to trade agreements and resolving trade-related disputes. The organization prohibits discrimination between trading partners, but provides exceptions for environmental protection, national security, and other important goals.

The WTO is headquartered in Geneva, Switzerland. Its top decision-making body is the Ministerial Conference, which is composed of all member states and usually convenes biennially; consensus is emphasized in all decisions. Day-to-day functions are handled by the General Council, made up of representatives from all members. A Secretariat of over 600 personnel, led by the Director-General and four deputies, provides administrative, professional, and technical services. The WTO's annual budget is roughly 220 million USD, which is contributed by members based on their proportion of international trade.

Studies show the WTO has boosted trade and reduced trade barriers. It has also influenced trade agreement generally; a 2017 analysis found that the vast majority of preferential trade agreements (PTAs) up to that point explicitly reference the WTO, with substantial portions of text copied from WTO agreements. Goal 10 of the United Nations Sustainable Development Goals also referenced WTO agreements as instruments of reducing inequality. However, critics contend that the benefits of WTO-facilitated free trade are not shared equally.

History

The WTO precursor General Agreement on Tariffs and Trade (GATT), was established by a multilateral treaty of 23 countries in 1947 after World War II in the wake of other new multilateral institutions dedicated to international economic cooperation—such as the World Bank (founded 1944) and the International Monetary Fund (founded 1944 or 1945). A comparable international institution for trade, named the International Trade Organization never started as the U.S. and other signatories did not ratify the establishment treaty, and so GATT slowly became a de facto international organization.

GATT negotiations before Uruguay

Seven rounds of negotiations occurred under GATT (1949 to 1979). The first real GATT trade rounds (1947 to 1960) concentrated on further reducing tariffs. Then the Kennedy Round in the mid-sixties brought about a GATT anti-dumping agreement and a section on development. The Tokyo Round during the seventies represented the first major attempt to tackle trade barriers that do not take the form of tariffs, and to improve the system, adopting a series of agreements on  non-tariff barriers, which in some cases interpreted existing GATT rules, and in others broke entirely new ground. Because not all GATT members accepted these plurilateral agreements, they were often informally called "codes". (The Uruguay Round amended several of these codes and turned them into multilateral commitments accepted by all WTO members. Only four remained plurilateral (those on government procurement, bovine meat, civil aircraft, and dairy products), but in 1997 WTO members agreed to terminate the bovine meat and dairy agreements, leaving only two.) Despite attempts in the mid-1950s and 1960s to establish some form of institutional mechanism for international trade, the GATT continued to operate for almost half a century as a semi-institutionalized multilateral treaty régime on a provisional basis.

Uruguay Round: 1986–1994

Well before GATT's 40th anniversary (due in 1987-1988), GATT members concluded that the GATT system was straining to adapt to a globalizing world economy. In response to problems identified in the 1982 Ministerial Declaration (structural deficiencies, spill-over impacts of certain countries' policies on world trade which GATT could not manage, etc.), a meeting in Punta del Este, Uruguay, launched the eighth GATT round — known as the Uruguay Round — in September 1986.

In the biggest negotiating mandate on trade ever agreed, the Uruguay Round talks aimed to extend the trading system into several new areas, notably trade in services and intellectual property, and to reform trade in the sensitive sectors of agriculture and textiles; all the original GATT articles were up for review. The Final Act concluding the Uruguay Round and officially establishing the WTO regime was signed on 15 April 1994, during the ministerial meeting at Marrakesh, Morocco - hence known as the Marrakesh Agreement.

The GATT still exists as the WTO's umbrella treaty for trade in goods, updated as a result of the Uruguay Round negotiations (a distinction is made between GATT 1994, the updated parts of GATT, and GATT 1947, the original agreement which is still the heart of GATT 1994). GATT 1994 is not, however, the only legally binding agreement included via the Final Act at Marrakesh; a long list of about 60 agreements, annexes, decisions, and understandings was adopted. The agreements fall into six main parts:
 the Agreement Establishing the WTO
 the Multilateral Agreements on Trade in Goods
 the General Agreement on Trade in Services
 the Agreement on Trade-Related Aspects of Intellectual Property Rights
 dispute settlement
 reviews of governments' trade policies

In terms of the WTO's  principle relating to tariff "ceiling-binding" (No. 3), the Uruguay Round has been successful in increasing binding commitments by both developed and developing countries, as may be seen in the percentages of tariffs bound before and after the 1986–1994 talks.

Ministerial conferences

The highest decision-making body of the WTO, the Ministerial Conference, usually meets every two years. It brings together all members of the WTO, all of which are countries or customs unions. The Ministerial Conference can take decisions on all matters under any of the multilateral trade agreements. Some meetings, such as the inaugural ministerial conference in Singapore and the Cancun conference in 2003 involved arguments between developed and developing economies referred to as the "Singapore issues" such as agricultural subsidies; while others such as the Seattle conference in 1999 provoked large demonstrations. The fourth ministerial conference in Doha in 2001 approved China's entry to the WTO and launched the Doha Development Round which was supplemented by the sixth WTO ministerial conference (in Hong Kong) which agreed to phase out agricultural export subsidies and to adopt the European Union's Everything but Arms initiative to phase out tariffs for goods from the least developed countries. At the sixth WTO Ministerial Conference of 2005 in December, WTO launched the Aid for Trade initiative and it is specifically to assist developing countries in trade as included in the Sustainable Development Goal 8 which is to increase aid for trade support and economic growth.

The Twelfth Ministerial Conference (MC12) was due to be held in Nur-Sultan, Kazakhstan, in June 2020 but was canceled because of the COVID-19 pandemic.

Doha Round (Doha Agenda): 2001–present

The WTO launched the current round of negotiations, the Doha Development Round, at the fourth ministerial conference in Doha, Qatar in November 2001. This was to be an ambitious effort to make globalization more inclusive and help the world's poor, particularly by slashing barriers and subsidies in farming. The initial agenda comprised both further trade liberalization and new rule-making, underpinned by commitments to strengthen substantial assistance to developing countries.

Progress stalled over differences between developed nations and the major developing countries on issues such as industrial tariffs and non-tariff barriers to trade particularly against and between the EU and the US over their maintenance of agricultural subsidies—seen to operate effectively as trade barriers. Repeated attempts to revive the talks proved unsuccessful, though the adoption of the Bali Ministerial Declaration in 2013 addressed bureaucratic barriers to commerce.

, the future of the Doha Round remained uncertain: the work programme lists 21 subjects in which the original deadline of 1 January 2005 was missed, and the round remains incomplete. The conflict between free trade on industrial goods and services but retention of protectionism on farm subsidies to domestic agricultural sectors (requested by developed countries) and the substantiation of fair trade on agricultural products (requested by developing countries) remain the major obstacles. This impasse has made it impossible to launch new WTO negotiations beyond the Doha Development Round. As a result, there have been an increasing number of bilateral free trade agreements between governments.  there were various negotiation groups in the WTO system for the current stalemated agricultural trade negotiation.

Functions
Promotion of growth by facilitating trade is the most important function of WTO. Other  important functions include:
 It oversees the implementation, administration and operation of the covered agreements (with the exception is that it does not enforce any agreements when China came into the WTO in Dec 2001)
 It provides a forum for negotiations and for settling disputes.
Additionally, it is WTO's duty to review and propagate the national trade policies and to ensure the coherence and transparency of trade policies through surveillance in global economic policy-making. Another priority of the WTO is the assistance of developing, least-developed and low-income countries in transition to adjust to WTO rules and disciplines through technical cooperation and training.
 The WTO shall facilitate the implementation, administration, and operation and further the objectives of this Agreement and the Multilateral Trade Agreements, and shall also provide the framework for the implementation, administration, and operation of the multilateral Trade Agreements.
 The WTO shall provide the forum for negotiations among its members concerning their multilateral trade relations in matters dealt with under the Agreement in the Annexes to this Agreement.
 The WTO shall administer the Understanding on Rules and Procedures Governing the Settlement of Disputes.
 The WTO shall administer a Trade Policy Review Mechanism.
 to achieve greater coherence in global economic policymaking, the WTO shall cooperate, as appropriate, with the International Monetary Fund (IMF) and with the International Bank for Reconstruction and Development (IBRD) and its affiliated agencies.

The above five listings are the additional functions of the World Trade Organization. As globalization proceeds in today's society, the necessity of an International Organization to manage the trading systems has been of vital importance. As the trade volume increases, issues such as protectionism, trade barriers, subsidies, violation of intellectual property arise due to the differences in the trading rules of every nation. The World Trade Organization serves as the mediator between the nations when such problems arise. WTO could be referred to as the product of globalization and also as one of the most important organizations in today's globalized society.

The WTO is also a center of economic research and analysis: regular assessments of the global trade picture in its annual publications and research reports on specific topics are produced by the organization. Finally, the WTO cooperates closely with the two other components of the Bretton Woods system, the IMF and the World Bank.

Principles of the trading system 
The WTO establishes a framework for trade policies; it does not define or specify outcomes. That is, it is concerned with setting the rules of "trade policy." Five principles are of particular importance in understanding both the pre-1994 GATT and the WTO:
 Non-discrimination. It has two major components: the most favored nation (MFN) rule and the national treatment policy. Both are embedded in the main WTO rules on goods, services, and intellectual property, but their precise scope and nature differ across these areas. The MFN rule requires that a WTO member must apply the same conditions on all trade with other WTO members, i.e., a WTO member has to grant the most favorable conditions under which it allows trade in a certain product type to all other WTO members. "Grant someone a special favor and you have to do the same for all other WTO members." National treatment means that imported goods should be treated no less favorably than domestically produced goods (at least after the foreign goods have entered the market) and was introduced to tackle non-tariff barriers to trade (e.g. technical standards, security standards et al. discriminating against imported goods).
 Reciprocity. It reflects both a desire to limit the scope of free-riding that may arise because of the MFN rule and a desire to obtain better access to foreign markets. A related point is that for a nation to negotiate, it is necessary that the gain from doing so be greater than the gain available from unilateral liberalization; reciprocal concessions intend to ensure that such gains will materialize.
 Binding and enforceable commitments. The tariff commitments made by WTO members in multilateral trade negotiation and on accession are enumerated in a legal instrument known as a schedule (list) of concessions. These schedules establish "ceiling bindings": a country can change its bindings, but only after negotiating with its trading partners, which could mean compensating them for loss of trade. If satisfaction is not obtained, the complaining country may invoke the WTO dispute settlement procedures.
 Transparency. The WTO members are required to publish their trade regulations, to maintain institutions allowing for the review of administrative decisions affecting trade, to respond to requests for information by other members, and to notify changes in trade policies to the WTO. These internal transparency requirements are supplemented and facilitated by periodic country-specific reports (trade policy reviews) through the Trade Policy Review Mechanism (TPRM). The WTO system tries also to improve predictability and stability, discouraging the use of quotas and other measures used to set limits on quantities of imports.
 Safety values. In specific circumstances, governments are able to restrict trade. The WTO's agreements permit members to take measures to protect not only the environment but also public health, animal health and plant health.
There are three types of provision in this direction:
 articles allowing for the use of trade measures to attain non-economic objectives;
 articles aimed at ensuring "fair competition"; members must not use environmental protection measures as a means of disguising protectionist policies.
 provisions permitting intervention in trade for economic reasons.

Exceptions to the MFN principle also allow for preferential treatment of developing countries, regional free trade areas and customs unions.

Organizational structure
The highest authority of the WTO is the Ministerial Conference, which must meet at least every two years. The Ministerial Conference met most recently in June 2022 in Geneva.

In between each Ministerial Conference, the daily work is handled by three bodies whose membership is the same; they only differ by the terms of reference under which each body is constituted.
 The General Council
 The Dispute Settlement Body
 The Trade Policy Review Body

The General Council, whose Chair as of 2020 is David Walker of New Zealand, has the following subsidiary bodies which oversee committees in different areas:

 Council for Trade in Goods There are 11 committees under the jurisdiction of the Goods Council each with a specific task. All members of the WTO participate in the committees. The Textiles Monitoring Body is separate from the other committees but still under the jurisdiction of the Goods Council. The body has its chairman and only 10 members. The body also has several groups relating to textiles.

 Council for Trade-Related Aspects of Intellectual Property Rights Information on intellectual property in the WTO, news and official records of the activities of the TRIPS Council, and details of the WTO's work with other international organizations in the field.

 Council for Trade in Services The Council for Trade in Services operates under the guidance of the General Council and is responsible for overseeing the functioning of the General Agreement on Trade in Services (GATS). It is open to all WTO members and can create subsidiary bodies as required.

Trade Negotiations Committee The Trade Negotiations Committee (TNC) is the committee that deals with the current trade talks round. The chair is WTO's director-general.  the committee was tasked with the Doha Development Round.

The Service Council has three subsidiary bodies: financial services, domestic regulations, GATS rules, and specific commitments. The council has several different committees, working groups, and working parties. There are committees on the following: Trade and Environment; Trade and Development (Subcommittee on Least-Developed Countries); Regional Trade Agreements; Balance of Payments Restrictions; and Budget, Finance and Administration. There are working parties on the following: Accession. There are working groups on the following: Trade, debt and finance; and Trade and technology transfer.

As of 31 December 2019, the number of WTO staff on a regular budget is 338 women and 285 men.

Decision-making
The WTO describes itself as "a rules-based, member-driven organization—all decisions are made by the member governments, and the rules are the outcome of negotiations among members". The WTO Agreement foresees votes where consensus cannot be reached, but the practice of consensus dominates the process of decision-making.

Richard Harold Steinberg (2002) argues that although the WTO's consensus governance model provides law-based initial bargaining, trading rounds close through power-based bargaining favoring Europe and the U.S., and may not lead to Pareto improvement.

Dispute settlement

The WTO's dispute-settlement system "is the result of the evolution of rules, procedures and practices developed over almost half a century under the GATT 1947". In 1994, the WTO members agreed on the Understanding on Rules and Procedures Governing the Settlement of Disputes (DSU) annexed to the "Final Act" signed in Marrakesh in 1994. Dispute settlement is regarded by the WTO as the central pillar of the multilateral trading system, and as a "unique contribution to the stability of the global economy". WTO members have agreed that, if they believe fellow-members are violating trade rules, they will use the multilateral system of settling disputes instead of taking action unilaterally.

The operation of the WTO dispute settlement process involves case-specific panels appointed by the Dispute Settlement Body (DSB), the Appellate Body, The Director-General and the WTO Secretariat, arbitrators, and advisory experts.

The priority is to settle disputes, preferably through a mutually agreed solution, and provision has been made for the process to be conducted in an efficient and timely manner so that "If a case is adjudicated, it should normally take no more than one year for a panel ruling and no more than 16 months if the case is appealed... If the complainant deems the case urgent, consideration of the case should take even less time. WTO member nations are obliged to accept the process as exclusive and compulsory.

According to a 2018 study in the Journal of Politics, states are less likely and slower to enforce WTO violations when the violations affect states in a diffuse manner. This is because states face collective action problems with pursuing litigation: they all expect other states to carry the costs of litigation. A 2016 study in International Studies Quarterly challenges that the WTO dispute settlement system leads to greater increases in trade.

However, the dispute settlement system cannot be used to resolve trade disputes that arise from political disagreements. When Qatar requested the establishment of a dispute panel concerning measures imposed by the UAE, other GCC countries and the US were quick to dismiss its request as a political matter, stating that national security issues were political and not appropriate for the WTO dispute system.

Accession and membership

The process of becoming a WTO member is unique to each applicant country, and the terms of accession are dependent upon the country's stage of economic development and the current trade regime. The process takes about five years, on average, but it can last longer if the country is less than fully committed to the process or if political issues interfere. The shortest accession negotiation was that of the Kyrgyz Republic, while the longest was that of Russia, which, having first applied to join GATT in 1993, was approved for membership in December 2011 and became a WTO member on 22 August 2012. Kazakhstan also had a long accession negotiation process. The Working Party on the Accession of Kazakhstan was established in 1996 and was approved for membership in 2015. The second longest was that of Vanuatu, whose Working Party on the Accession of Vanuatu was established on 11 July 1995. After a final meeting of the Working Party in October 2001, Vanuatu requested more time to consider its accession terms. In 2008, it indicated its interest to resume and conclude its WTO accession. The Working Party on the Accession of Vanuatu was reconvened informally on 4 April 2011 to discuss Vanuatu's future WTO membership. The re-convened Working Party completed its mandate on 2 May 2011. The General Council formally approved the Accession Package of Vanuatu on 26 October 2011. On 24 August 2012, the WTO welcomed Vanuatu as its 157th member. An offer of accession is only given once consensus is reached among interested parties.

A 2017 study argues that "political ties rather than issue-area functional gains determine who joins" and shows "how geopolitical alignment shapes the demand and supply sides of membership". The "findings challenge the view that states first liberalize trade to join the GATT/WTO. Instead, democracy and foreign policy similarity encourage states to join."

Accession process

A country wishing to accede to the WTO submits an application to the General Council, and has to describe all aspects of its trade and economic policies that have a bearing on WTO agreements. The application is submitted to the WTO in a memorandum which is examined by a working party open to all interested WTO Members.

After all necessary background information has been acquired, the working party focuses on issues of discrepancy between the WTO rules and the applicant's international and domestic trade policies and laws. The working party determines the terms and conditions of entry into the WTO for the applicant nation and may consider transitional periods to allow countries some leeway in complying with the WTO rules.

The final phase of accession involves bilateral negotiations between the applicant nation and other working party members regarding the concessions and commitments on tariff levels and market access for goods and services. The new member's commitments are to apply equally to all WTO members under normal non-discrimination rules, even though they are negotiated bilaterally. For instance, as a result of joining the WTO, Armenia offered a 15 per cent ceiling bound tariff rate on accessing its market for goods. Together with the tariff bindings being ad valorem there are no specific or compound rates. Moreover, there are no tariff-rate quotas on both industrial and agricultural products. Armenia's economic and trade performance growth was noted since its first review in 2010, especially its revival from the 2008 global financial crisis, with an average annual 4% GDP growth rate, despite some fluctuations. Armenia's economy was marked by low inflation, diminishing poverty, and essential progress in enhancing its macroeconomic steadiness in which trade in goods and services, which is the equivalent of 87% of GDP, played a growing role.

When the bilateral talks conclude, the working party sends to the general council or ministerial conference an accession package, which includes a summary of all the working party meetings, the Protocol of Accession (a draft membership treaty), and lists ("schedules") of the member to be commitments. Once the general council or ministerial conference approves of the terms of accession, the applicant's parliament must ratify the Protocol of Accession before it can become a member. Some countries may have faced tougher and a much longer accession process due to challenges during negotiations with other WTO members, such as Vietnam, whose negotiations took more than 11 years before it became an official member in January 2007.

Members and observers
The WTO has 164 members and 25 observer governments. Liberia became the 163rd member on 14 July 2016, and Afghanistan became the 164th member on 29 July 2016. In addition to states, the European Union, and each EU country in its own right, is a member. WTO members do not have to be fully independent states; they need only be a customs territory with full autonomy in the conduct of their external commercial relations. Thus Hong Kong has been a member since 1995 (as "Hong Kong, China" since 1997) predating the People's Republic of China, which joined in 2001 after 15 years of negotiations. Taiwan acceded to the WTO in 2002 as the "Separate Customs Territory of Taiwan, Penghu, Kinmen and Matsu." The WTO Secretariat omits the official titles (such as Counsellor, First Secretary, Second Secretary and Third Secretary) of the members of Taiwan's Permanent Mission to the WTO, except for the titles of the Permanent Representative and the Deputy Permanent Representative.

As of 2007, WTO member states represented 96.4% of global trade and 96.7% of global GDP. Iran, followed by Algeria, are the economies with the largest GDP and trade outside the WTO, using 2005 data. With the exception of the Holy See, observers must start accession negotiations within five years of becoming observers. A number of international intergovernmental organizations have also been granted observer status to WTO bodies. Ten UN members have no affiliation with the WTO.

Agreements
The WTO oversees about 60 different agreements which have the status of international legal texts. Member countries must sign and ratify all WTO agreements on accession. A discussion of some of the most important agreements follows.

The Agreement on Agriculture came into effect with the establishment of the WTO at the beginning of 1995. The AoA has three central concepts, or "pillars": domestic support, market access and export subsidies.

The General Agreement on Trade in Services was created to extend the multilateral trading system to service sector, in the same way as the General Agreement on Tariffs and Trade (GATT) provided such a system for merchandise trade. The agreement entered into force in January 1995.

The Agreement on Trade-Related Aspects of Intellectual Property Rights sets down minimum standards for many forms of intellectual property (IP) regulation. It was negotiated at the end of the Uruguay Round of the General Agreement on Tariffs and Trade (GATT) in 1994.

The Agreement on the Application of Sanitary and Phytosanitary Measures—also known as the SPS Agreement—was negotiated during the Uruguay Round of GATT, and entered into force with the establishment of the WTO at the beginning of 1995. Under the SPS agreement, the WTO sets constraints on members' policies relating to food safety (bacterial contaminants, pesticides, inspection, and labeling) as well as animal and plant health (imported pests and diseases).

The Agreement on Technical Barriers to Trade is an international treaty of the World Trade Organization. It was negotiated during the Uruguay Round of the General Agreement on Tariffs and Trade and entered into force with the establishment of the WTO at the end of 1994. The object ensures that technical negotiations and standards, as well as testing and certification procedures, do not create unnecessary obstacles to trade".

The Agreement on Customs Valuation, formally known as the Agreement on Implementation of Article VII of GATT, prescribes methods of customs valuation that Members are to follow. Chiefly, it adopts the "transaction value" approach.

In December 2013, the biggest agreement within the WTO was signed and known as the Bali Package.

Office of director-general

The procedures for the appointment of the WTO director-general were updated in January 2003, and include quadrennial terms. Additionally, there are four deputy directors-general.  under director-general Ngozi Okonjo-Iweala, the four deputy directors-general are:
 Angela Ellard of the United States (as of 4 May 2021)
 Anabel González of Costa Rica (as of 4 May 2021)
 Ambassador Jean-Marie Paugam of France (as of 4 May 2021)
 Ambassador Xiangchen Zhang of China (as of 4 May 2021)

List of directors-general
Source: Official website

2020 Director-General selection

In May 2020, Director-General Roberto Azevedo announced that he would step down on 31 August 2020. , a nomination and selection process is currently under way with eight candidates and the final selection is expected on 7 November 2020 with the consensus of 164 member countries. A strong consensus had formed around the candidacy of Ngozi Okonjo-Iweala but on 28 October it emerged that the US representative was opposed to her appointment.

WTO members made history on 15 February 2021 when the General Council agreed by consensus to select Ngozi Okonjo-Iweala of Nigeria as the organization's seventh Director-General.

Okonjo-Iweala will became the first woman and the first African to be chosen as Director-General. Her term, renewable, will expire on 31 August 2025.

Budget
The WTO derives most of the income for its annual budget from contributions by its Members. These are established according to a formula based on their share of international trade.

Criticism 

Although tariffs and other trade barriers have been significantly reduced thanks to GATT and WTO, the promise that free trade will accelerate economic growth, reduce poverty, and increase people's incomes has been questioned by many critics. Some prominent skeptics cite the example of El Salvador. In the early 1990s, they removed all quantitative barriers to imports and also cut tariffs. However, the country's economic growth remained weak. On the other hand, Vietnam which only began reforming its economy in the late 1980s, saw a great deal of success by deciding to follow China's economic model and liberalizing slowly along with implementing safeguards for domestic commerce. Vietnam has largely succeeded in accelerating economic growth and reducing poverty without immediately removing substantial trade barriers.

Economist Ha-Joon Chang argues that there is a "paradox" in neo-liberal beliefs regarding free trade because the economic growth of developing countries was higher in the 1960–1980 period compared to the 1980–2000 period even though its trade policies are now far more liberal than before. Also, there are results of research that show that new countries actively reduce trade barriers only after becoming significantly rich. From the results of the study, WTO critics argue that trade liberalization does not guarantee economic growth and certainly not poverty alleviation.

Critics also put forward the view that the benefits derived from WTO facilitated free trade are not shared equally. This criticism is usually supported by historical accounts of the outcomes of negotiations and/or data showing that the gap between the rich and the poor continues to widen, especially in China and India, where economic inequality was growing at the time even though economic growth is very high. In addition, WTO approaches aiming to reduce trade barriers can harm developing countries. Trade liberalization that is too early without any prominent domestic barriers is feared to trap the developing economies in the primary sector, which often does not require skilled labor. And when these developing countries decide to advance their economy utilizing industrialization, the premature domestic industry cannot immediately skyrocket as expected, making it difficult to compete with other countries whose industries are more advanced.

Impact
Studies show that the WTO boosted trade. Research shows that in the absence of the WTO, the average country would face an increase in tariffs on their exports by 32 percentage points. The dispute settlement mechanism in the WTO is one way in which trade is increased.

According to a 2017 study in the Journal of International Economic Law, "nearly all recent preferential trade agreements (PTAs) reference the WTO explicitly, often dozens of times across multiple chapters. Likewise, in many of these same PTAs we find that substantial portions of treaty language—sometime the majority of a chapter—is copied verbatim from a WTO agreement... the presence of the WTO in PTAs has increased over time."

See also

 Agreement on Trade Related Investment Measures

 Anti-globalization movement
 China and the World Trade Organization
 Criticism of the World Trade Organization
 Foreign Affiliate Trade Statistics

 Geographical Indications of Goods (Registration and Protection) Act, 1999
 Global administrative law
 Information Technology Agreement
 International Trade Centre
 Labour Standards in the World Trade Organisation
 List of member states of the World Trade Organization
 Non-tariff barriers to trade
 North American Free Trade Agreement
 Swiss Formula
 Trade bloc
 Washington Consensus
 World Trade Organization Ministerial Conference of 1999 protest activity
 World Trade Report

Notes and references

Further reading

 Acharya, Rohini, et al. "Trade and Women—Opportunities for Women in the Framework of the World Trade Organization." Journal of International Economic Law 22.3 (2019): 323-354.
 Bishop, Matthew Louis, and Zhang Xiaotong. "Why is China a reluctant leader of the World Trade Organization?" New Political Economy 25.5 (2020): 755-772. online
 Bowen, T. Renee, J. Lawrence Broz, and Marc-Andreas Muendler. "The World Trade Organization and US Domestic Politics". Working Paper, 2021. online
 Broude, Tomer. “The World Trade Organization: A Short Introduction.” Journal of International Economic Law, vol. 14, no. 3, 2011, pp. 435–451.

 Busch, Marc L., and Eric Reinhardt. “The Political Economy of World Trade Organization Negotiations: The Design of the Multilateral Trading System.” International Organization, vol. 57, no. 3, 2003, pp. 565–599.
  Graziano, Daniela. “The World Trade Organization in the Global Governance Network: A Political Analysis of Its Role and Functions.” Global Governance vol. 15, no. 4, 2009, pp. 467–484.

 Holland, Kenneth. "The Trump Administration's Critique of the World Trade Organization and Its Implications for the International Trading System." Indian Journal of international economic law  13 (2021): 154+.  online
 Jackson, John H. The World Trading System: Law and Policy of International Economic Relations. ( MIT Press, 2017).
 Joost, Peter. “The World Trade Organization: Structure and Jurisprudence.” International Trade Law and Regulationvol. 9, no. 5, 2003, pp. 1–12.
 Karlas, Jan, and Michal Parízek. "Supply of Policy Information in the World Trade Organization: Cross-National Compliance with One-Time and Regular Notification Obligations, 1995–2014." World Trade Review 19.1 (2020): 30-50.

 Matsushita, Mitsuo, et al. The World Trade Organization: law, practice, and policy (Oxford University Press, 2015). online

 Palmeter, David, Petros C. Mavroidis, and Niall Meagher. Dispute Settlement in the World Trade Organization (Cambridge University Press, 2022.) online
 Pearson, Margaret M. "China in Geneva: lessons from China's early years in the World Trade Organization"  in New Directions in the Study of China's Foreign Policy (Stanford University Press, 2022) pp. 242-275.
 Qureshi, Asif H. The World Trade Organization: implementing international trade norms." The World Trade Organization (Manchester University Press, 2022).

External links
 
 
 
 International Trade Centre – joint UN/WTO agency

 
International trade organizations
Organisations based in Geneva
Organizations established in 1995
World government
Trade blocs
International trade law
Foreign direct investment
Treaties entered into force in 1995
United Nations General Assembly observers
International organisations based in Switzerland